The 2018 FIA World Rallycross Championship presented by Monster Energy was the fifth season of the FIA World Rallycross Championship an auto racing championship recognised by the Fédération Internationale de l'Automobile (FIA) as the highest class of international rallycross.

Johan Kristoffersson won the Drivers' Championship for the second season running during the World RX of the United States.

Calendar

The 2018 championship was contested over twelve rounds in Europe, Africa and North America.

Calendar changes
 The championship will expand to include a round in the United States for the first time, with the Circuit of the Americas in Austin, Texas scheduled to host the event in conjunction with the Americas Rallycross Championship.
 The World RX of Great Britain event will relocate from Lydden Hill Race Circuit to a new venue at the Silverstone Circuit.
 The Hockenheim round of the championship was discontinued to accommodate the new American round.
The World RX of Canada also shares an event with the Americas Rallycross Championship.

Entries

Supercar

Drivers with a green background are ineligible to score points towards the Championship for Teams.
 — Despite having been born in France, Grégoire Demoustier is recognised by  the FIA World Rallycross Championship as a Belgian driver for the duration of the 2018 season.

RX2

2 Despite having been born in Andorra, Albert Llovera is recognised by the RX2 International Series and by extension, the FIA World Rallycross Championship as a Spanish driver for the duration of the 2018 season.

Team changes
 Hoonigan Racing Division withdrew from the series at the conclusion of the 2017 championship.
 Team Peugeot Total will step up their involvement in World RX, running as a full factory team in 2018, as compared to the family-based Hansen Motorsport-run cars in 2017.
 Olsbergs MSE returned to World RX full-time in 2018 after competing part-time in 2017. They will debut their new-specification 2018 Ford Fiesta ST MK8 Supercars, built in collaboration with Ford Performance in Barcelona.
 GC Kompetition (GCK) will make their World RX debut as a team entry. Team owner and driver Guerlain Chicherit oversaw the development of the new Renault Mégane R.S. RX, which was built in collaboration with Prodrive.
 GRX Taneco will enter the championship, using a pair of ex-Hyundai Motorsport Hyundai i20 WRC cars built to rallycross specifications by Set Promotion. Double world rally champion Marcus Grönholm will be the team's principal.
 Sébastien Loeb Racing will enter the championship with a single Peugeot 208 WRX run for Grégoire Demoustier.

Driver changes
 Andreas Bakkerud left Hoonigan Racing Division to join EKS RX.
 Toomas Heikkinen and Reinis Nitišs both left EKS RX. Nitišs will instead re-join Set Promotion, the team in which he won the Super1600 championship with in 2013, and compete in the FIA European Rallycross Championship with an M-Sport Ford Fiesta. Heikkinen also joined the team, but stepped down from driving duties, becoming Nitišs’ team manager and a driving coach for Set Promotion's Super1600 drivers.
 After spending a year with MJP Racing Team Austria in 2017, Kevin Eriksson returned to his father's Olsbergs MSE team alongside fellow countryman Robin Larsson, who will make his return to World RX after a year sabbatical.
 Jérôme Grosset-Janin will partner team owner and driver Guerlain Chicherit, driving for the new GCK team.
 Double European Rallycross champion Timur Timerzyanov left STARD to join GRX Taneco, partnering  Niclas Grönholm in the new Hyundai i20.

Results and standings

World Championship points are scored as follows:

A red background denotes drivers who did not advance from the round

FIA World Rallycross Championship for Drivers

a Ekström received no points from the final as he was disqualified after crashing into Solberg.  
b Loss of fifteen championship points – stewards' decision  
c Loss of ten championship points – stewards' decision

FIA World Rallycross Championship for Teams

RX2 International Series
(key)

See also
2018 in rallycross

References

External links

 
World Rallycross Championship seasons
World Rallycross Championship